Takhtgah-e Jahan Bakhsh (also Romanized as Takhtgāh-e Jahān Bakhsh; also known as Takhtegāh-e Dāneyālī, Takhtgāh-e Dānīāl, Takhtgāh-e Dānīālī, Takht Gāh-e Jahānbakhsh Solţān, and Takhtgān) is a village in Gurani Rural District, Gahvareh District, Dalahu County, Kermanshah Province, Iran. At the 2006 census, its population was 263, in 72 families.

References 

Populated places in Dalahu County